Leigh Torrence (born January 4, 1982) is a former American football cornerback who is now an assistant coach for the New York Jets. He was signed by the Green Bay Packers as an undrafted free agent in 2005.  He played college football at Stanford.

He has also played for the Atlanta Falcons, Washington Redskins, New Orleans Saints, and Jacksonville Jaguars.

Early life
Torrence attended Marist School near Atlanta, where he played football, ran track, and won two state tennis titles.  At Stanford he won two letters in track and four in football, and was named to the Academic All-Pac-10 team.

Professional career

Green Bay Packers
The Green Bay Packers signed Torrence April 29, 2005. The Packers released September 3, 2005.

Atlanta Falcons
The Atlanta Falcons claimed Torrence off waivers on September 4, 2005, and signed him to the practice squad. He was activated from the squad and promoted to the 53-man roster on October 12, 2005.

Torrence was waived on September 2, 2006.

Washington Redskins
The Washington Redskins signed Torrence on December 27, 2006. The team released him on November 8, 2008. During his first stint with the Redskins, Torrence played in 25 games and recorded 42 tackles, one sack, and two pass breakups.

New Orleans Saints
With the Saints in 2009, Torrence was active for five of the team's first ten games, recording 10 tackles and a half sack.  He injured his shoulder in the Saints' November 22 win over Tampa Bay and was placed on the injured reserve list on November 23, making room for the Saints to re-sign veteran cornerback Mike McKenzie.

On March 9, 2010, Torrence signed a 1-year contract to return to the New Orleans Saints. He was waived on September 7 but re-signed on September 14. Torrence made several key plays in a nationally televised Sunday Night Football game against the Pittsburgh Steelers on October 31, 2010, first tackling Antwaan Randle El just short of the goal line to prevent a Steelers touchdown in the first half, then intercepting Ben Roethlisberger's pass late in the fourth quarter to seal the Saints' 20–10 win.  It was the first interception of his NFL career.

On October 26, 2011, against the Indianapolis Colts, Torrence intercepted Curtis Painter's pass and returned it 42 yards for his first NFL touchdown.

Torrence has been noted for his support of the Sojourner Truth Academy, a New Orleans charter school high school founded by a Stanford classmate: Torrence raised $50,000 from his Saints teammates that was matched by an NFL grant and used to fund the school's football team.

Second Stint with Redskins
The Washington Redskins signed Torrence on April 10, 2012. The team released him on June 2, 2012.

Jacksonville Jaguars
Torrence was signed by the Jacksonville Jaguars on July 31, 2012, and later released on August 31.

Coaching career

New Orleans Saints
Torrence was a coaching intern for the Saints in 2016, and on March 5, 2017, it was reported that the Saints had promoted him to defensive assistant coach.

New York Jets
In February 2020, Torrence was named assistant defensive backs coach for the New York Jets.

References

External links

Jacksonville Jaguars bio
New Orleans Saints bio
Washington Redskins bio
Stanford Cardinal bio
New York Jets bio

1982 births
Living people
Players of American football from Raleigh, North Carolina
Players of American football from Atlanta
American football cornerbacks
Stanford Cardinal football players
Atlanta Falcons players
Washington Redskins players
New Orleans Saints players
Jacksonville Jaguars players
Green Bay Packers players
Marist School (Georgia) alumni